Nagako Konishi (born 16 September 1945) is a Japanese composer.

Biography
She was born in Agematsu, Nagano, and graduated from Tokyo National University of Fine Arts and Music in 1971. She continued her education at the University of California at Berkeley and served as head of the Japan Federation of Women Composers. She won 1st Prize for Composition in the All-Japan Chorus League, 1971.

Works
Selected works include:
The Memory from the Wind for 2 Recorders (1990)
For the sea border for solo piano
Unasaka e for solo piano
Indigo Sky for organ
Misty poem for alto flute and harp
Away the White (1990)
Edge of Sea (2004)
Lamentation for clarinet, piano
Poetry of Autumn
Ballade “Love of Melfa”	
Robin Hood Fantasy two pianos
Icicles

Links
CiNii: Nagako Konishi

References

1945 births
20th-century classical composers
20th-century Japanese musicians
21st-century classical composers
21st-century Japanese musicians
Japanese classical composers
Japanese women classical composers
Japanese music educators
Living people
20th-century Japanese educators
21st-century Japanese educators
Women music educators
20th-century women composers
21st-century women composers
20th-century women educators
21st-century women educators
21st-century Japanese women musicians